Neolitsea parvigemma is a species of small to medium-sized tree in the family Lauraceae. It is endemic to Taiwan, and confined to the south central mountain regions of the island.

A number of chemicals from N. parvigemma show interesting biological properties. The hydrodistillated leaf essential oil of N. parvigemma has antifungal and anti-wood-decay fungal properties Sesquiterpenes isolated from the stems have anti-inflammatory properties.

References

parvigemma
Trees of Taiwan
Endemic flora of Taiwan